Carlos Molina may refer to:

 Carlos Molina (American boxer) (born 1985), American light welterweight boxer
 Carlos Molina (Mexican boxer) (born 1983), Mexican light middleweight boxer
 Carlos Molina (guitarist) (born 1946), Cuban guitarist and professor
 Carlos Molina (politician) (born 1974), Puerto Rican politician
 Carlos Rodríguez Molina (born 1988), Spanish footballer